Michael Slovis is an American cinematographer and television director. He is best known for his cinematography on the AMC series Breaking Bad.

Career
Slovis began his professional career in 1981. For many years, he worked as a camera operator on films. He became a cinematographer in 1995, working on the films Party Girl (1995), Half Past Dead (2002), Halloweentown (1998), The Thirteenth Year (1999), and Ready to Run (2000). In 2000, Slovis became a cinematographer on the series Ed, and worked on the series CSI: Crime Scene Investigation, New Amsterdam, Fringe, Royal Pains, Rubicon, Running Wilde, Breaking Bad, and Better Call Saul.

As a director, Slovis made his directorial debut with the 2001 television film Spirit. Later, he directed episodes of Ed, CSI: Crime Scene Investigation, Rubicon, Breaking Bad, Law & Order: Special Victims Unit, and Hell on Wheels In 2006, Slovis won a Primetime Emmy Award for Outstanding Cinematography for a One Hour Series for his work on CSI.

In 2014, Slovis directed the first two episodes of the fifth season of the HBO series Game of Thrones, titled "The Wars to Come" and "The House of Black and White". In 2017, he directed episode 3 of the second season of the series Preacher. That same year, he directed the episode "Something They Need" in the seventh season of The Walking Dead, and returned to the series in 2018 to direct the season eight episode "Worth".

Personal life
Slovis currently resides in Montclair, New Jersey with his wife Maria. They have three children. He is an alumnus of New York University's Tisch School of the Arts and holds a BFA in Professional Photographic Illustration from Rochester Institute of Technology.

References

External links

American cinematographers
American television directors
Living people
People from Montclair, New Jersey
People from Plainfield, New Jersey
Primetime Emmy Award winners
Tisch School of the Arts alumni
Year of birth missing (living people)